Dieter Meier (born 4 March 1945) is a Swiss industrialist, musician and conceptual artist. He is the frontman of the electronic music group Yello, which was co-founded (with ex-member Carlos Perón) by music producer Boris Blank. He is a vocalist and lyricist, as well as manager and producer of the group.

Biography and career

Early life
Meier was born on 4 March 1945 in Zürich, Switzerland. He started studying law at university but dropped out without a degree. After that he tried working at a bank and as a professional gambler. Due to his father, who Meier claims rose from poor origins to become a successful private banker, by the time he went to university, Meier was already a millionaire.

Musical career

In the late 1970s Meier was brought in when the two founders of the Swiss electronic band Yello realised that they required a singer. The band was originally formed by Boris Blank (keyboards, sampling, percussion, backing vocals) and Carlos Perón (tapes) in the late 1970s. Perón left the band in 1983 to pursue a solo career, ultimately leaving Blank and Meier to record their most well known and commercially successful single "Oh Yeah" in which Meier provided almost all vocals, backing vocals and lyrics. "Oh Yeah" went on to appear in numerous films and television series in the following decades including Ferris Bueller's Day Off, director Jonathan Demme's Something Wild with Jeff Daniels and Melanie Griffith,  and the episode of South Park "Hell on Earth 2006".

Along with Talking Heads vocalist David Byrne, Meier was a guest artist on the X-Press 2 album Muzikizum. He also performed lead vocals on the single "I Want You Back".

Artist
As a conceptual artist, he has been keeping himself busy with many art exhibitions. He began his career as a performance artist in the late 1960s. In 1972 as part of Documenta 5, Meier installed a commemorative plaque at the railway station in Kassel (Germany) which read: "On 23 March 1994, from 3 to 4 pm, Dieter Meier will stand on this plaque". He honored the promise 22 years later.

Meier directed numerous films and videos, including German music group Alphaville's "Big in Japan" video. 

In the 1990s music took a backseat as Meier continued his performance art, designed silk scarves and was involved with ReWATCH, a company that recycles cans into watches. However, two more Yello albums did surface. In the late nineties, he bought  of land in Argentina, a four-hour drive away from Buenos Aires. The ranch is named "Ojo de Agua". His restaurant and store in Zurich has the same name from which he sells wine, meat, corn and soy products.

Acting
In 1989 Meier played a demimonde businessman in the Swiss drama-comedy Leo Sonnyboy by Rolf Lyssy, and in 1992 he had a part in the Daniel Schmid comedy, Hors Saison. In 2006 he acted in the bit part of 'Gamsie' in National Lampoon's Pledge This! In 2013, he played a furrier in the film Finsterworld.

Business ventures
Meier  serves on the board of Euphonix, a company that produces technology used in recording studios. His successful investments in companies and business ventures during the last decades have brought Meier assets which are estimated around 150-200 million Swiss franc .

Personal life
He is the father of five  children: Eleonore, Sophie, Anna, Francis and Christoph. Meier now lives in Zurich with his wife Monique Meier.

References

External links
 Dieter Meier's Official site
 Official site of "Ojo de Agua", Dieter Meier's ranch
 

1945 births
Living people
20th-century Swiss musicians
21st-century Swiss musicians
Artists from Zürich
Swiss pop musicians
Swiss contemporary artists
Synth-pop musicians
Musicians from Zürich